Chris Williams  (born 9 March 1963) is a Welsh academic, best known for his work on editing the diaries of Richard Burton. Since 2017, Williams has been Head of the College of Arts, Celtic Studies and Social Sciences, and Professor of History at University College Cork, Ireland.

Career 
Williams is a graduate of Balliol College, Oxford, and obtained his doctorate from Cardiff University before becoming a lecturer there. He subsequently worked at the University of Glamorgan and in 2005 became Professor of Welsh History and Director of the Research Institute for Arts and Humanities at Swansea University. He is a former Royal Commissioner with the Royal Commission on the Ancient and Historical Monuments of Wales and was Chairman of the Welsh Heritage Schools Initiative. In 2013 he took up his appointment at Cardiff University. Williams was appointed Head of the College of Arts, Celtic Studies and Social Sciences in 2017 at UCC.

Research
Williams' edition of the Burton diaries was published by Yale University Press. The diaries were donated to Swansea University by Burton's widow, Sally Burton, in 2006. He has written extensively on the history of the South Wales Coalfield and on modern Welsh history and most recently on the history of political cartoons and caricature in Britain from the 18th century to the Second World War.

Personal life 
Williams spent the first three years of his life in Newport but after his father got a job his family had to move. He grew up mostly in Swindon and did his O-Levels and A-Levels, spending a year in the army before going to the University of Oxford. His first academic job was at Cardiff University when he was 25.

He has lectured on mountaineering around the world and in Wales. A keen walker, he has climbed La Breche De Rolland in the French Pyrenees, Ben Nevis, Snowdon and Pen-y-Fan.

Works
B. L. Coombes (Writers of Wales series) (with William D. Jones; 1999) 
With Dust Still in His Throat: A B.L.Coombes Anthology (with Bill Jones; 1999)
Postcolonial Wales (ed, with Jane Aaron; 2005)
Robert Owen and his Legacy (ed., with Noel Thompson; 2011)The Richard Burton Diaries (ed; 2012)The Gwent County History, vol. 4 (ed, with Sian Rhiannon Williams; 2011)The Gwent County History'', vol. 5 (ed, with Andy Croll; 2013)

References

Living people
Alumni of Balliol College, Oxford
Alumni of Cardiff University
Academics of Swansea University
Academics of Cardiff University
Place of birth missing (living people)
21st-century Welsh historians
Historians of Wales
1963 births